The 1991 New Orleans Night season was the 1st season for the franchise. They were formed as part of an expansion for 1991. They went 4–6 and missed the playoffs.

Regular season

Schedule

Standings

y – clinched regular-season title

x – clinched playoff spot

Roster

Awards

Coaching
Eddie Khayat was the first head coach of the Night.

External links
1991 New Orleans Night at ArenaFan.com

New Orleans Night
New Orleans Night seasons
New Orleans Night